Vincent Newman (born 1965) is an American film producer.

Filmography

Producer
Soundman (1998) (co-producer)
The Last Marshal (1999) (producer)
A Better Way to Die (2000) (executive producer)
In the Shadows (2001) (producer)
Sol Goode (2001) (producer)
Poolhall Junkies (2002) (producer)
A Man Apart (2003) (producer)
Blind Horizon (2003) (producer)
Felon (2008) (executive producer)
The Betrayed (2008) (producer)
Red Dawn (2012) (executive producer)
We're the Millers (2013) (producer)
Patient Zero (producer)
Maybe I Do (TBA) (producer)

References

External links

American film producers
Living people
Place of birth missing (living people)
Year of birth missing (living people)